St. Joseph's Mission may refer to:

Canada
 Saint Joseph's Mission (Williams Lake), a former Canadian Indian residential school in British Columbia

United States
St. Joseph's Mission (Culdesac, Idaho)
St. Joseph's Mission (Tampico, Washington)